Metallurg Bekabad Stadium is the official home of Metallurg Bekabad.

History
Originally stadium had capacity of 5,000. After reconstruction works of the old stadium which finished in summer 2012 capacity of new the new all-seater stadium increased to 15,000.

References

Football venues in Uzbekistan